Mildred Barber Abel (January 9, 1902 – September 29, 1976) was a member of the Wisconsin State Assembly.

Biography
Abel was born on January 9, 1902, in Greenwood, Wisconsin. Her father, Joseph L. Barber, was a member of the Assembly as well as the Wisconsin State Senate. They became the first father and daughter to serve together in a state legislature in the history of the United States. In 1928, she married Otto Abel. They had one son together in addition to a daughter from Otto Abel's first marriage. She died on September 29, 1976, and is buried in Wausau, Wisconsin.

Career
Abel was elected to the Assembly in 1925. She was one of three women who were elected to the Assembly that year. They were the first women elected to the state legislature in the history of Wisconsin. She was a member of the Progressive Party.

References

People from Greenwood, Wisconsin
Members of the Wisconsin State Assembly
Wisconsin Progressives (1924)
Women state legislators in Wisconsin
1902 births
1976 deaths
20th-century American politicians
20th-century American women politicians